The 595th Command and Control Group is an active unit of the United States Air Force. It is organized under Air Force Global Strike Command (AFGSC), and its operations are centered at Offutt Air Force Base, Nebraska.  It was activated in a ceremony held on 6 October 2016.

Mission
The mission of the 595th Command and Control Group is to consolidate the Air Force's portion of the nuclear triad, including Air Force nuclear command and control communications, under the auspices of Global Strike Command. Previously, portions of the Air Force's command and control of nuclear operations had been divided among AFGSC, Air Combat Command, and the Twentieth Air Force.

Units
The 595th Command and Control Group is composed of four squadrons:
 1st Airborne Command Control Squadron, which operates the Boeing E-4 National Airborne Command Post mission.
 595th Strategic Communications Squadron
 595th Aircraft Maintenance Squadron
 625th Strategic Operations Squadron

History

The unit was first organized by Air Force Systems Command in May 1970 as the 6595 Missile Test Group.  In early 1970s, the group conducted ground and flight tests of the Minuteman weapon system.  It also launched and tested missile, space and aeronautical systems in support of Department of Defense programs.

After the loss of the Space Shuttle Challenger in January 1986, the space program was grounded for 34 months until the launch of Space Transportation System-26 in September 1988.  After 11 Sep 2001, the group examined vulnerabilities of US space facilities at home and abroad.   The Air Force's Tactical Exploitation of National Capabilities Program transferred national capabilities to operational commands.  The group's Air Force Space Battlelab developed and field tested capabilities to increase productivity of operational commands.  Its Aerospace Fusion Center supported space missile launches.

The group supported Operation Iraqi Freedom through the application of space applications programs during 2003 and 2004.

The Group now has a shared commander with the National Airborne Operations Center.

Lineage
 Designated as the 6595th Missile Test Group and activated on 1 May 1970
 Redesignated 6595th Test and Evaluation Group on 1 January 1988
 Inactivated on 14 September 1993
 Redesignated 595th Test and Evaluation Group on 1 April 2000
 Activated on 7 April 2000
 Redesignated 595th Space Group on 1 August 2002
 Inactivated on 1 April 2013
 Redesignated 595th Command and Control Group on 26 August 2016
 Activated 1 October 2016

Assignments
 6595th Aerospace Test Wing, 1 May 1970
 Western Space and Missile Center, 1 October 1979
 Ballistic Missile Organization, 1 October 1990
 Space and Missile Systems Center, 2 – 14 Sep 1993
 Space Warfare (later, Space Innovation and Development) Center, 7 April 2000 – 1 April 2013
 Eighth Air Force, 1 October 2016 – present

Operational Components
 1st Airborne Command Control Squadron: 1 October 2016 – present
 17th Test Squadron: 7 April 2000 – 1 April 2013
 25th Space Control Tactics (later, 25th Space Range) Squadron: 1 July 2004 – 14 April 2006
 527th Space Aggressor Squadron: 23 October 2002 – 1 April 2013
 576th Flight Test Squadron: 7 Apr 2000 – 1 December 2009

Stations
Vandenberg Air Force Base, California, 1 May 1970 – 14 September 1993
Schriever Air Force Base, Colorado, 7 April 2000 – 1 April 2013
Offutt Air Force Base, Nebraska, 6 October 2016 – present

Aircraft & Missiles
LGM-30 Minuteman (1970–1993, 2000–2001)
LGM-118 Peacekeeper (1983–1989, 2000–2005)
SM-65 Atlas (1970–1990)
SM-68 Titan (1970–1993)
Boeing E-4B (2016–present)

Awards

List of commanders

 Col Paul J. Burnett, 8 June 2000
 Col Michael J. Carey, 20 June 2002
 Col John E. Hyten, 1 July 2004
 Col John S. Riordan, 6 July 2005
 Col Stephen Latchford, 16 April 2007
 Col Shawn J. Barnes, May 2009
 Col Kevin M. Rhoades, 30 June 2011
 Unknown, 14 June 2012 – 1 April 2013
 Col Robert L. Billings, 1 October 2016 – July 2018
 Col. Jeremiah Baldwin, July 2018 - July 2020
 Col. Brian Golden, July 2020 - August 2022
 Col David Leaumont, August 2022 -

References

External links
595th Command and Control Group Fact Sheet

Command and control units and formations of the United States Air Force
Groups of the United States Air Force
Military units and formations established in 2016